Ammertzwiller (before 2015: Ammerzwiller, Alsatian: Àmmerzwiller) is a former commune in the Haut-Rhin department in north-eastern France. On 1 January 2016, it was merged into the commune Bernwiller.

See also
 Communes of the Haut-Rhin department

References

Former communes of Haut-Rhin